Kaarlo Kustaa "Kalle" Paasia (28 August 1883 – 19 December 1961) was a Finnish gymnast who won bronze in the 1908 Summer Olympics.

Gymnastics 

He won the Finnish national championship in team gymnastics as a member of Ylioppilasvoimistelijat in 1909.

Biography 

His parents were farmer Kalle Kustaa Paasia and Amanda Kustaantytär. He was married twice:
 Edit Erika Kalalahti (1917)
 Helmi Elisabet Kivekäs (1922)

He completed his matriculation exam at the Hämeenlinna Lyceum in 1905 and graduated as an agronomist in 1911.

He worked as a chief executive officer of Toijala dairy, principal and teacher of Päivölä farm school, an assistant at the state butter inspection plant in Hanko and a manager at the butter inspection plant in Turku.

Sources

References 

1883 births
1961 deaths
People from Valkeakoski
People from Häme Province (Grand Duchy of Finland)
Finnish male artistic gymnasts
Gymnasts at the 1908 Summer Olympics
Olympic gymnasts of Finland
Olympic bronze medalists for Finland
Olympic medalists in gymnastics
Medalists at the 1908 Summer Olympics
Sportspeople from Pirkanmaa
20th-century Finnish people